Bazar is a village in the Zhytomyr Oblast in North-Western Ukraine. In a past it used to be a town. Bazar is located in Korosten Raion which suffered from the Chernobyl disaster and some populated places were abandoned and population was relocated.

History
Bazar is probably best known for the execution on November 22, 1921 of 359 soldiers of the Ukrainian National Republic army during the final stages of the Second Winter Campaign.  In 1941, an attempt was organised by Oleh Kandyba Olzhych to create a memorial to the fallen, however this was prevented by mass arrests by the occupying Nazi forces.

References

External links

Villages in Korosten Raion